Dignity (a.k.a. Dignity of Earth & Sky) is a sculpture on a bluff overlooking the Missouri River near Chamberlain, South Dakota. The 50-foot (15.24 meter) high stainless steel statue by South Dakota artist laureate Dale Claude Lamphere depicts an Indigenous woman in Plains-style dress receiving a star quilt. According to Lamphere, the sculpture honors the culture of the Lakota and Dakota peoples who are indigenous to South Dakota. Assisting Lamphere were sculptors Tom Trople, Jim Maher, Andy Roltgen, and Grant Standard. Automotive paint expert Brook Loobey assisted with the colors for the quilt, and Albertson Engineering of Rapid City, South Dakota, ensured the sculpture would endure the strong winds common in the area.

History
Norm and Eunabel McKie of Rapid City, South Dakota, announced their gift of Dignity to the State of South Dakota in 2014, in honor of the 125th anniversary of South Dakota statehood. The statue was erected in September 2016 at a site near Interstate 90, where it overlooks the river. It is situated in the Chamberlain Interstate Welcome Center located at mile post 264 and is accessible by both directions of travel.

The star quilt held by the woman has more than 100 blue diamond shapes that move in the wind "like an Aspen leaf".

Three Native American women from Rapid City, SD served as the models for the sculpture. The artist began by first drawing the form and then sculpting a one-eighth-scale model. The sculpture was created in an isolated area near the Cheyenne River, east of Rapid City, SD, and later moved to the installation site. The statue boldly proclaims that South Dakota's Native cultures are alive, standing with dignity.

Since July 1, 2017, South Dakota residents are now able to purchase auto license plates bearing the likeness of Dignity. The plates were designed with the help of the statue's designer.

When interviewed nearly a year after the dedication, Lamphere said "It's been well-received by the Native community, and by visitors from all over the country. My hope over time is it really gets people to think about the beauty of the native cultures."
In a 2017 column published in the Sioux Falls Argus Leader, Susan Claussen Bunger, instructor of Native American social systems, wrote: 

As is evident through history, humans will ultimately disillusion and betray. As is such, I have a new role model who is solid and sturdy. She literally owns a spine of steel and reminds me of the injustice in the world, but also of strength, perseverance and survival. She signifies people who have prevailed through the centuries. She represents all who resist and strive forward. She portrays a rallying cry for those who wish to be heard and valued. She stands strong and proud, meeting the morning sun and bracing against the nighttime cold. She contemplates the world through a poise of conviction and fearlessness. Her name is "Dignity".

Tribal names
Lamphere's plan is to put the name of every federally recognized tribe on a stainless steel band around the base of the statue. He said, "I wanted something that would really honor the indigenous people of the Great Plains and I kept that in mind all the time. I made the work reflect the name that it has of 'Dignity', and I think that's part of what makes it work so well."
On April 27, 2020 the Dignity statue was used as a clue on the game show Jeopardy! The clue was "A 50-foot stainless steel South Dakota statue called Dignity honors the culture of the Dakota and this group whose name rhymes with Dakota." The answer was "the Lakota tribe." The contestant answered correctly.

See also
African Renaissance Monument
Crazy Horse Memorial
Christ the Redeemer
Christ of the Andes
The Motherland Calls
Statue of Liberty (Liberty Enlightening the World)
List of statues

References

External links
Dignity Statue A Gift To The People Of South Dakota - video of installation
Video of dedication ceremony
Artist's statement

2016 establishments in South Dakota
2016 sculptures
Outdoor sculptures in South Dakota
Stainless steel sculptures
Statues in South Dakota
Steel sculptures in the United States
Colossal statues in the United States
Sculptures of Native Americans
Sculptures of women in the United States
Brule County, South Dakota
Monuments and memorials in South Dakota